Mohamed Ofei Sylla  (15 August 1974 – 4 February 2019) was a Guinean professional football midfielder.

Club career
Sylla played in the Turkish Super Lig for Gaziantepspor and Denizlispor.

International career
Sylla played for the Guinea national football team, including appearing at the finals of the 1994 African Nations Cup and 1998 African Nations Cup.

Later life and death
Sylla died on 4 February 2019, aged 44, following a short illness.

References

1974 births
2019 deaths
Guinean footballers
Guinea international footballers
Expatriate footballers in France
1994 African Cup of Nations players
Guinean expatriate sportspeople in Turkey
1998 African Cup of Nations players
Ismaily SC players
Gaziantepspor footballers
Guinean expatriates in France
Denizlispor footballers
Expatriate footballers in Turkey
Vannes OC players
Association football midfielders